Jetting may refer to:
 Cable jetting
 Jetting (injection moulding defect)